F. Gérard Dufresne,   (1918 – 27 January 2013 ) was a well-known local politician and a military officer in Shawinigan, Quebec.

Born in East Angus, Quebec, Eastern Townships in 1918, he got a degree from the Shawinigan Technical Institute and would later make career as an insurance agent.

Military
Dufresne became a member of the 694 Army Cadet Corps (Collège Immaculée-Conception) in 1933 and then became a reservist with the Régiment de Joliette.

During World War II he commanded an infantry company in England and served in the Netherlands, with the Régiment des Fusiliers Mont-Royal and in Germany.

After the war, he became the commanding officer of the Shawinigan-based C Company of the Régiment de Joliette.

In 1953, Dufresne was promoted lieutenant colonel and served as commander of the 62nd (Shawinigan) Field Artillery Regiment, which he had joined in 1948, until 1960.

From 1966 to 2005, he was the Honorary Colonel of the same unit.

In 2006, local military author Captain (ret) Guy Arcand, CD published a book on Gérard Dufresne 'Biographie du Col Gerard F. Dufresne, CM, ED, OSTJ, CD' La Societe d'histoire militaire mauricienne.

Politics
In 1963, Dufresne was elected Mayor of Shawinigan against François Roy.

Under his tenure, the old City Market (located downtown) was demolished to make room for a Woolworth's retail store and Boulevard Royal was extended to the current location of the Biermans movie theater. Also, the construction of the Centre des Arts de Shawinigan (located at 2100 Boulevard des Hêtres and completed in 1967) began.

In 1966 he lost his bid for re-election to Maurice Bruneau.

In 1970, Dufresne was the Liberal candidate in the district of Saint-Maurice. He finished third with 24.3% of the vote, behind Union Nationale incumbent Philippe Demers (36.9%) and Parti Québécois candidate Yves Duhaime (24.4%).

Duhaime had been an officer of the 62nd (Shawinigan) Field Artillery Regiment at the time Dufresne was its commanding officer.

Dufresne is a federalist, a loyal supporter of Prime Minister Jean Chrétien and has remained a card-carrying member of the Liberal Party of Canada for decades.

Footnotes

See also
 62nd (Shawinigan) Field Artillery Regiment
 Liberal Party of Canada
 Liberal Party of Quebec
 Mayors of Shawinigan
 Mauricie
 Saint-Maurice Provincial Electoral District

References
 J.J. Bellemare, 60 ans d'artillerie en Mauricie, 1996

1918 births
Canadian military personnel of World War II
Mayors of Shawinigan
2013 deaths